Hooveria parviflora is a species of perennial herb known by the common name smallflower soap plant. It is a monocot, native to coastal southern California and Baja California, where it is a member of the coastal sage scrub flora. It resembles a smaller version of Chlorogalum pomeridianum, with wavy leaves and white flowers that open during the day.

Description

The bulb is covered in a dark brown, membranous coat.

There are several flowers or buds per node. On the flower, the perianth parts spread from above the base, and are colored a white to pink, with a darker midvein. Atop the stamens are yellow anthers. The fruits are  large, with 1 to 2 black, ovoid seeds per chamber.

The flower opens in the morning, and is closed by the evening, only being open for a single day.

Taxonomy 
This species was described as Chlorogalum parviflorum by Sereno Watson. Phylogenetic research placed this species in a new taxa, Hooveria, separating it from Chlorogalum.

Distribution and habitat 
This species is native to California and Baja California. In California, it is primarily found on the coast of far Southern California, and is particularly common around San Diego. In Baja California, the plant is uncommon, and is only found in the extreme northwest of the state.

References

External links
 Calflora Database: Chlorogalum parviflorum (small flowered soaproot)
Jepson Manual eFlora (TJM2) treatment of Chlorogalum parviflorum
USDA Plants Profile for Chlorogalum parviflorum (small flowered soaproot)
Flora of North America
UC Photos gallery — Chlorogalum parviflorum

parviflora
Flora of California
Flora of Baja California
Natural history of the California chaparral and woodlands
Natural history of the Peninsular Ranges
Natural history of the Transverse Ranges
Taxa named by Sereno Watson